is a district located in Chiyoda, Tokyo. The Hotel New Otani Tokyo, Sophia University, Yahoo! Corporation, and Shimizudani Park are located there.

The name of the district is a portmandeau derived from the names of the Kii clan, the Owari clan, and the Ii clan, all of whom had residences there during the Edo era.

Education
 operates public elementary and junior high schools. Banchō Elementary School (千代田区立番町小学校) is the zoned elementary school for Kioichō. There is a freedom of choice system for junior high schools in Chiyoda Ward, and so there are no specific junior high school zones.

References

Districts of Chiyoda, Tokyo